Wah Chang Corporation was an American manufacturing company in the metal or alloy industry based in Albany, Oregon in the United States. Since 2014, it is a business unit of ATI.

History 
In 1916 (some sources say 1914), Chinese American mining engineer Kuo-Ching "KC" Li, Sr. founded the company in New York state, under the name Wah Chang Trading Corporation. Wah Chang is Cantonese for "fortunate enterprise" or "great development". This expanded as an international tungsten ore and concentrate trading company. Li remained with the company until his death in 1961, serving as president until 1960 and then board chairman.

In 1946, the company built a plant in Union City, New Jersey.

In the 1950s, it was also operating tungsten mines in Calento, Nevada, and near Bishop, California.

In 1953, Stephen W. H. Yih, who had Master's Degrees in Electrical Engineering and Mechanical Engineering, was hired by Wah Chang Trading Corporation in New York to head up the Titanium Project. 

In 1955, Kuo-Ching Li, Sr., Founder of the Wah Chang Trading Corporation, New York, sent his top engineer, Stephen W. H. Yih to the Titanium Development Plant to learn how to make Titanium. This is where he met Wing Muin Mark, who was directing operations at the Titanium Development Plant. Within one year, Mark and Yih collaborated to produce the highest purity titanium in the world.

In 1956, the Energy Commission (AEC) contracted with Wah Chang to operate the U.S. Bureau of Mines zirconium plant in Albany, Oregon, to develop high-purity zirconium for use in the United States Navy's nuclear program. After Wah Chang was granted an additional two-year contract, it decided to build its own zirconium production facility.

In May 1956, the Albany, Oregon based Wah Chang Corporation hired Wing Muin Mark, as its 2nd employee behind Yih. Mark was tasked with designing the plant and production equipment and supervising operations for the new Zirconium plant. Wah Chang began construction of its new plant in August. And on Christmas Day 1956, just four months later, the first commercially produced batch of Zirconium sponge was pulled from the reduction furnaces at the new production facility. Mark later developed the processes for making high-purity Hafnium and Titanium. 

In the early 1970s, Wing Mark proposed the idea of making high-purity Hafnium Crystal Bar to Teledyne Wah Chang Albany. He went on to design the production plant, equipment, and process which produced a 99.99999% Hafnium purity, earning him the nickname, “Mr. Hafnium.” 

Wah Chang was privately owned by K.C. Li until 1967, when it was acquired by Teledyne, the main Albany plant (located in the then-unincorporated area known as Millersburg) becoming a subsidiary named Teledyne Wah Chang Albany, or TWCA. In 1966, Wah Chang had around 1,200 employees, in plants in Albany, Oregon; Glen Cove, New York; Huntsville, Alabama; and Texas City, Texas, and sales of $40.7 million. The Albany plant was by far the largest, and at the time of its sale to Teledyne, it accounted for around $20 million in annual revenue, with 860 employees at that location.  The Alabama factory became a separate subsidiary named Teledyne Wah Chang Huntsville.

In 1975, TWCA had 1,400 employees, and had $100 million in annual sales.

The Millersburg plant was listed as a Superfund site in 1983, requiring environmental clean-up, which the company carried out over the following several years.

After Teledyne merged with Allegheny Ludlum Corporation in 1996, to become Allegheny Technologies Incorporated, the company became ATI Wah Chang.

Wah Chang People 
 Kuo-Ching "KC" Li, Sr. - Founder, President, and Chairman of Wah Chang Corporation.
Wing Muin Mark (a.k.a. "Mr. Hafnium") - Chief Engineer/Architect/Operations Manager at Wah Chang Corporation and Teledyne Wah Chang Albany, who developed the processes for producing high-purity Hafnium (99.99999%), Zirconium, and Titanium. Mark received his Bachelor of Science Degree in Chemistry and a Minor in Metallurgy from the University of Illinois at Urbana-Champaign in 1949.
 Stephen W. H. Yih - Engineer and President (after Kuo-Ching Li, Sr.) of Teledyne Wah Chang Albany in Albany. Yih served as President for 20 years.
Edmund F. Baroch - Vice President of Teledyne Wah Chang in Albany, Oregon

Merger and Acquisition 
 1916 Kuo-Ching Li founded Wah Chang Trading Corporation in New York state.
 1967 Acquired by Teledyne and became Teledyne Wah Chang Albany (TWCA) located in Albany, Oregon. It became a subsidiary of Teledyne.
 Wah Chang's Alabama plant became Teledyne Wah Chang Huntsville, a subsidiary of Teledyne.
 1996 Teledyne acquired by Allegheny Ludlum Corporation, which created parent company named Allegheny Technologies Incorporated (ATI). Teledyne Wah Chang became ATI Wah Chang.
 2014  ATI Wah Chang renamed ATI Specialty Alloys and Components, a business unit of ATI.

ATI 
In March 2014, it was renamed ATI Specialty Alloys and Components.

See also 
 Teledyne Technologies

References

Manufacturing companies based in Oregon
Companies based in Albany, Oregon
Manufacturing companies established in 1916
1916 establishments in New York (state)
Metal companies of the United States
1967 mergers and acquisitions
2014 mergers and acquisitions
American companies established in 1916
Teledyne Technologies